Intrapreneurial Bricolage (IB) is the pursuit of entrepreneurial endeavors, operating within a larger organization using only limited, available resources. The term combines the two concepts of intrapreneurship and bricolage. Intrapreneurship uses principles and strategies from the discipline of entrepreneurship and applies them within the confines of an organization rather than initiating new ones. Borrow from the French word for "makeshift job", bricolage is a type of art using whatever media is at hand. In the context of intrapreneurial bricolage, intrapreneurs find innovative ways to work with a scarcity of resources.

Background 

In The Savage Mind, French anthropologist Claude Lévi-Strauss discussed 'bricolage' as having roots in the French idea of a worker who uses his hands inventively to accomplish what other workers cannot. In his description of this jack-of-all-trades, Lévi-Strauss explains that there is no requirement for skills and tools to be highly specialized. Instead, this 'bricoleur' is flexible enough to be able to use minimal resources for multiple applications.

Hidden Assets 

One of the key principles of IB is finding utility in resources commonly overlooked. These resources can be divided into tangible and intangible assets. Often these assets are overlooked because they are obscured, dispersed or underutilized. Some examples of hidden assets include:

 Personal Knowledge or Skills
 Networking
 Germinal Financing
 Information Technology

References 

Entrepreneurship
Neologisms articles with topics of unclear notability
Neologisms